Hvaler Fjordcruise AS is a company that operates a passenger ferry between Skjærhalden in Hvaler, Norway and Strømstad, Sweden. The company was founded after the privatization of Hvaler Båt- og Fergeselskap in 2001, and operates one ship, MS Vesleø II.

References

External links
 Official site

Ferry companies of Viken
Hvaler